Prorocopis is a genus of moths of the family Noctuidae. The genus was erected by Edward Meyrick in 1897. All the species in the genus are known from Australia.

Species
Prorocopis acroleuca Turner, 1929 Queensland
Prorocopis eulopha (Lower, 1903) New South Wales
Prorocopis euxantha Lower, 1902 Queensland
Prorocopis leucocrossa Lower, 1903 New South Wales
Prorocopis melanochorda Meyrick, 1897 Western Australia
Prorocopis stenota Lower, 1903 Queensland, New South Wales
Prorocopis transversilinea (Turner, 1941) Queensland

References

Calpinae
Moth genera